The Virunga Mountains (also known as Mufumbiro) are a chain of volcanoes in East Africa, along the northern border of Rwanda, the Democratic Republic of the Congo (DRC), and Uganda. The mountain range is a branch of the Albertine Rift Mountains, which border the western branch of the East African Rift. They are located between Lake Edward and Lake Kivu.  The name "Virunga" is an English version of the Kinyarwanda word ibirunga, which means "volcanoes".

The mountain range consists of eight major volcanoes. Most of them are dormant, except Mount Nyiragongo  and Mount Nyamuragira , both in the DRC. Recent eruptions occurred in 2006,  2010 and May 2021.

The Virunga Mountains are home of the critically endangered mountain gorilla, listed on the IUCN Red List of Endangered Species due to habitat loss, poaching, disease, and war (Butynski et al. 2003). The Karisoke Research Center, founded by Dian Fossey to observe gorillas in their native habitat, is located between Mount Karisimbi and Mount Bisoke.

List of mountains peaks in the Virunga Mountain Range

National parks

Virunga National Park, Democratic Republic of the Congo
Volcanoes National Park, Rwanda
Mgahinga Gorilla National Park, Uganda

In culture
Michael Crichton's novel Congo is set mostly in the Virunga region.
Gorillas in the Mist, and the novel of the same name, document the work and death of primatologist Dian Fossey. The camp from which she operated, Karisoke Research Center, still exists in the Virunga Mountains.

See also
George Schaller
Earl Denman

References

External links

Official Virunga National Park website
Volcanoes National Park Travel Guide
- Virunga Mountains Profile
 Kwita Izina - Conservation is life
Map of Virunga Mountains
- Virunga Volcanoes Travel Portal

 
Albertine Rift montane forests
Mountain ranges of the Democratic Republic of the Congo
Mountain ranges of Rwanda
Mountain ranges of Uganda
World Heritage Sites in the Democratic Republic of the Congo